Some evidence for homosexual behavior in pre-Columbian Peru has survived since the Spanish conquest of Peru in the form of erotic ceramics. Such pottery  originated from several ancient civilizations of Peru, the most famous of these being the Moche and Chimu cultures.

Arrival of the Spanish and banning of homosexuality

Once the Spanish arrived, in the 16th century, they were astonished at the sexual practices of the natives. Viceroy Francisco de Toledo and the priests were aghast to discover that homosexuality was accepted and that the indigenous population also did not prohibit premarital sex or hold female chastity to be of any particular importance.

Historian Maximo Terrazos describes how the Spanish reconciled this native sexuality with the Catholic faith:

However, homosexuality in Peru was decriminalised in 1837.

Ceramics

Over a span of 800 years, pre-Columbian central Andean cultures, especially the Moche, created at least tens of thousands of ceramics. A few such ceramics show skeletons undeniably engaged in homosexuality; four depict gay male anal intercourse, one depicts lesbian penetration with the clitoris. Many others show partners where at least one member is of indeterminate sex, like the oral sex ceramic shown above, where the genitalia of the person on their knees is not visible. Such works, due perhaps to heterosexist bias, have often been interpreted as depicting a heterosexual couple.

Destruction
Many of the ceramics, along with most indigenous icons, were smashed. In the 1570s, Toledo and his clerical advisers organized to eliminate sodomy, masturbation and a common social practice which roughly translated from the native Quechua means "trial marriage". As Terrazos describes, "You couldn't talk about them because they were considered [pornographic]." They were prohibited due to "taboo imposed by the Christian religion that men have sex only for procreation and that women do not experience sexual pleasure."

Survival
In spite of this organized effort to destroy these artifacts, many have survived to the present day. For decades, the erotic ceramics were locked away from the public, accessible only to an elite group of Peruvian social scientists. Occasionally and reluctantly they were made available to select foreign researchers from the United States and Europe. The Larco Museum in Lima, Peru is well known for its gallery of pre-Columbian erotic pottery.

See also
LGBT rights in Peru

References

History of Peru
LGBT history in Peru
 Peru
LGBT in Peru
Indigenous topics of the Andes